Euaspa milionia, the water hairstreak, is a small butterfly found in India, Nepal and (E. m. formosana Nomura, 1931) Taiwan that belongs to the lycaenids or blues family.

See also
List of butterflies of India
List of butterflies of India (Lycaenidae)

References
 
  
 
 
 
 

Butterflies of Asia